Jarosław Dąbrowski is a Polish historical film about Jarosław Dąbrowski. It was released in 1976.

Cast 
 Zygmunt Malanowicz − Jarosław Dąbrowski
 Małgorzata Potocka − Pelagia Dąbrowska, żona Jarosława
 Aleksandr Kalagin − Tuchołko
 Wiktor Awdiuszko − Władisław Ozierow
 Władimir Iwaszow − Andrij Potebnia
 Stanisław Niwiński − Bronisław Szwarce
 Stefan Szmidt − Walery Wróblewski
 Józef Nowak − Bronisław Wołowski

References

External links
 

1976 films
Polish biographical films
Polish historical films
1970s Polish-language films
Films set in the 1860s
Films set in the 1870s
Films about the Paris Commune
Soviet multilingual films
Soviet biographical films
Soviet historical films
Polish multilingual films
1970s historical films
1970s biographical films